This article lists shopping malls in Nigeria with a gross leasable area of at least 10,000 square meters. The shopping centres which are operational or under construction are listed below. 
Further information can be found here

Malls by gross leasable area

See also 

 List of largest shopping malls in the world
 List of shopping malls in Nigeria

References 

Nigeria
Nigeria
Shopping malls, largest